Mariya Aleksandrovna Kiselyova (born September 28, 1974 in Samara) is a female synchronised swimmer from Russia. She competes in synchronised swimming and has won three Olympic golds and three golds in the world championships. In Russia, she is currently known as a TV show presenter and a politician for the ruling United Russia party. She is currently a member of the Moscow City Duma.

Electoral History

External links

Russian synchronized swimmers
Olympic synchronized swimmers of Russia
Synchronized swimmers at the 1996 Summer Olympics
Synchronized swimmers at the 2000 Summer Olympics
Synchronized swimmers at the 2004 Summer Olympics
Olympic gold medalists for Russia
1974 births
Living people
Sportspeople from Samara, Russia
Olympic medalists in synchronized swimming
Medalists at the 2004 Summer Olympics
Medalists at the 2000 Summer Olympics
Deputies of Moscow City Duma